Morris W. Offit b. ca 1937 is an American businessman.

Moffit is Chairman at Offit Hall Capital Management LLC, founder and former chief executive officer at Offitbank (since merged with Wachovia), and independent director of American International Group, elected to the Board of Directors and chairman of the Audit Committee in August 2005. He was a director at Wachovia following their acquisition of Offitbank.

Moffit was born to a Jewish family, the son of Rhea (née Wolf) and Michael Offit.

Moffit is a supporter of the Two state solution in Israel. He served as Chairman of the Board of Johns Hopkins University (1990-1996), Chairman of the Board of the Jewish Museum (1987-1991), trustee of the New-York Historical Society, and trustee of The Museum of the American Revolution. He also served a three-year term as president of UJA-Federation of New York. He currently serves as a trustee of the American Institute for Contemporary German Studies.

Moffit was honored as The New Jewish Home's Eight over Eighty Gala 2017 honoree.

References

American International Group
American Jews
Living people
Year of birth missing (living people)